Lake Killarney is a reservoir in Iron County in the U.S. state of Missouri.

Lake Killarney takes its name from the Lakes of Killarney, in Ireland.

See also
List of lakes in Missouri

References

Bodies of water of Iron County, Missouri
Reservoirs in Missouri